Rafael Martínez Torres (born February 14, 1959) is a Puerto Rican jurist. Since 2009 he has served as an associate justice of the Supreme Court of Puerto Rico.

Early life and education
Martínez was born in Humacao, Puerto Rico. He received a bachelor's degree in political science from the University of Puerto Rico, Río Piedras Campus. Afterwards, he received a Juris Doctor degree from the University of Puerto Rico School of Law, where he served as editor of the Law Review. Martínez was also research assistant of José Julián Álvarez, a prominent Constitutional Law professor.

Judicial career
After working in private practice and in the House of Representatives of Puerto Rico, Martínez was appointed to the Puerto Rico Court of Appeals by Governor Pedro Rosselló. After spending 14 years in that Court, Governor Luis Fortuño elevated him to Associate Justice of the Supreme Court to fill the vacancy left by Justice Baltasar Corrada del Río. That seat had been vacant for over three years.

He was sworn in on March 10, 2009. The Constitution of Puerto Rico mandates that Supreme Court Justices must retire when they reach the age of seventy. Therefore, Justice Martínez term will expire in 2029.

See also
List of Hispanic/Latino American jurists

References

 Supreme Court Website, in Spanish

1959 births
Living people
Associate Justices of the Supreme Court of Puerto Rico
Hispanic and Latino American judges
People from Humacao, Puerto Rico
Puerto Rican judges
Puerto Rican lawyers
University of Puerto Rico alumni